Gerontha acrosthenia is a species of moth of the family Tineidae. It is found in northern Australia (including Queensland) and New Guinea.

References

Moths described in 1972
Myrmecozelinae
Moths of Australia
Moths of New Guinea